The Peugeot 3008 DKR is an off-road competition car specially designed to take part in rally raids with the main objective of winning the Dakar Rally. The team is Team Peugeot Total.

Engine Specifications

Dakar victories

See also
Peugeot 3008

References

External links
 3008 DKR, la nuova sfida Peugeot alla Dakar 2017 

Rally cars
Rally raid cars
Dakar Rally winning cars